Globotrochus is a genus of air-breathing land snails, terrestrial pulmonate gastropod mollusks in the subfamily Camaeninae of the family Camaenidae.

Species
Species within the genus Globotrochus include:
 Globotrochus mellea (Bavay & Dautzenberg, 1915)
 Globotrochus onestera (Mabille, 1887)

References

 Haas, F. (1935). Kleine Bemerkungen IV. Archiv für Molluskenkunde. 67: 45–47. page(s): 47
 Bank, R. A. (2017). Classification of the Recent terrestrial Gastropoda of the World. Last update: July 16th, 2017

External links
 
 Sutcharit, C.; Backeljau, T.; Panha, S. (2019). Re-description of the type species of the genera Ganesella Blanford, 1863 and Globotrochus Haas, 1935; with description of a new Ganesella species from Thailand (Eupulmonata, Camaenidae). ZooKeys. 870: 51-76

Camaenidae